The 3rd Artistic Gymnastics World Championships were held in Prague, Bohemia, in conjunction with the 5th Czech Sokol  Slet on 30 June 1907.

A historic signpost in the sometimes contentious politics of the sport occurred with respect to these championships.  In a 100-year Anniversary Publication of the International Federation of Gymnastics, a past observation of Dr. Miroslav Klinger, an honorary member of the FIG, was noted with regards to a German magazine article.  In that FIG publication, it is written that an article in a 1907 issue of the German publication Deutsche Turnzeitung "dissuaded the non-slavic nations from participating in the international competition in Prague, by saying the competitors could be threatened by violence.  The goal of the article was to pressure the president of the European Federation into the renunciation of the Prague event.  Nevertheless, the German Federation sent observers to Prague."

Medals

Note
Official FIG documents credit medals earned by athletes from Bohemia as medals for Czechoslovakia.

All Round

Team Competition

High Bar

Parallel bars

Pommel Horse

References

World Artistic Gymnastics Championships
G
World Artistic Gymnastics Championships, 1907
1907 in Austria-Hungary
Sports competitions in Prague
International gymnastics competitions hosted by Czechoslovakia
1900s in Prague
June 1907 sports events